Jaan Einasto (born 23 February 1929) is an Estonian astrophysicist and one of the discoverers of the large-scale structure of the Universe.

Born Jaan Eisenschmidt in Tartu, the name "Einasto" is an anagram of "Estonia" (it was chosen by his patriotic father in the 1930s to replace the family's German name). He attended the University of Tartu, where he received the Ph.D. equivalent in 1955 and a senior research doctorate in 1972. From 1952, he has worked as a scientist at the Tartu Observatory (1977–1998) Head of the Department of Cosmology; from 1992–1995, he was Professor of Cosmology at the University of Tartu. For a long time, he was Head of the Division of Astronomy and Physics of the Estonian Academy of Sciences in Tallinn. Einasto is a member of the Academia Europaea, the European Astronomical Society and the Royal Astronomical Society; he has received three Estonian National Science Awards.

1947 Tartu Secondary School No. 1
1952 University of Tartu
1955 Cand.Sc. in physics and mathematics
1972 D.Sc. in physics and mathematics
1992 Professor

Since 1991 he is member of Academia Europaea. Since 1994 he is member of the Royal Astronomical Society.

The asteroid 11577 Einasto, discovered in 1994, is named in his honour.

In 1974, in a seminal work with Kaasik and Saar at the Tartu Observatory, Einasto argued that "it is necessary to adopt an alternative hypothesis: that the clusters of galaxies are stabilised by hidden matter."  This was a key paper in recognizing that a hidden matter, i.e., dark matter, could explain observational anomalies in astronomy.

Einasto showed in 1977 at a Symposium in Tallinn (Estonia) that 
the universe has a cell structure, in which the observed matter surrounds huge empty voids.

See also
Einasto profile
Vera Rubin - her discovery of "flat rotation curves" is the most direct and robust evidence of dark matter

References

External links
Jaan Einasto page at the Tõravere Observatory

1929 births
Cosmologists
Living people
Estonian astrophysicists
Estonian astronomers
20th-century Estonian physicists
Members of Academia Europaea
Members of the Estonian Academy of Sciences
Recipients of the Order of the National Coat of Arms, 2nd Class
University of Tartu alumni
Hugo Treffner Gymnasium alumni
People from Tartu